Phacusa nicobarica is a moth of the family Zygaenidae. It was described by George Hampson in 1919. It is found on the Nicobar Islands in the eastern Indian Ocean.

References

Moths described in 1919
Procridinae